Donald Joseph McDermott (December 7, 1929 – November 1, 2020) was an American speed skater. He was born in The Bronx, New York. At the 1952 Olympics in Oslo McDermott was silver medalist in the 500 meters. On November 2, 2020, it was announced that McDermott had died at the age of 90.

References

External links

1929 births
2020 deaths
American male speed skaters
Speed skaters at the 1952 Winter Olympics
Speed skaters at the 1956 Winter Olympics
Olympic silver medalists for the United States in speed skating
Sportspeople from the Bronx
Medalists at the 1952 Winter Olympics